Kawaimina is a syllabic abbreviation used to refer to four languages or dialects of East Timor:
 Kairui, Midiki, Waimaha, and Naueti, 
spoken by one or two thousand speakers each. It is a name used by linguists discussing the languages, not the speakers themselves. The first three, which may be co-dialects, are spoken in adjacent areas in the western part of Baucau District, along the north coast. Naueti is used on the south coast of eastern Viqueque District, surrounded by speakers of Makasae and Makalero. Some Midiki speakers near Ossu refer to their language as Osomoko.

Geoffrey Hull classifies these as dialects and groups them into a single Kawaimina language, while Ethnologue groups the varieties into three distinct languages.

Except perhaps for Naueti, the Kawaimina languages are members of the Timor–Babar family of Austronesian languages. While structurally the languages are Malayo-Polynesian, their vocabulary, particularly that of Naueti, derives mostly from Papuan languages. In this they are similar to Makasae and Habun; none of these languages are easy to classify as either Austronesian or Papuan. The languages are noted for both archaisms and unusual innovations, including vowel harmony and aspirated and glottalized consonants in their sound-systems.

References

External links
The Waimaha language of East Timor
Ethnologue page for Kairui-Midiki
Ethnologue page for Nauete
Ethnologue page for Waimaha
Survey of the languages of East Timor

Languages of East Timor